Lovely Te Lovely is a Punjabi feature film starring Gurjit Singh, Kamz Singh, Pooja Thakur and Hardeep Gill. Casting of the movie was done by Kamz Kreationz and Shaifali Srivastav. Music from the film was released on 18 July 2015. It was released on 24 July 2015.

Cast
Gurjit Singh
Kamz Singh
Hardeep Gill 
Pooja Thakur
Sonika Chauhan 
Pamma Singh

Reception

Box office

References

External links

Official Facebook
Lovely te Lovely - official trailer
Lovely te Lovely full movie

2015 films
Punjabi-language Indian films
2010s Punjabi-language films